Frank Dermody (born May 29, 1951) is an American politician. He was a Democratic member of the Pennsylvania House of Representatives, representing the 33rd district from 1991 until 2020. Dermody served as House Democratic Leader from 2011 until 2020.

Background
One of five children, Dermody was born in Scranton, Pennsylvania, and raised in nearby Clarks Summit. His father, a demolition expert who worked in the coal mines, died when Frank was 7. To support the family, his mother worked various jobs, including with Capitol Records, the Social Security Administration, and the Pennsylvania Department of Transportation.

After graduating from Abington Heights High School, he received a scholarship to play football at Columbia University in New York City. He earned a Bachelor of Arts degree in history from Columbia in 1973. For the next five years, he worked in sales for two different companies in New York while saving money for law school. He received his Juris Doctor from Indiana University School of Law-Bloomington in 1982.

Dermody then returned to Pennsylvania, working as an assistant public defender in Harrisburg. He served as assistant district attorney in Allegheny County for five years. During his tenure in the district attorney's office, he was appointed by Governor Bob Casey in 1989 to fill an unexpired term as district justice for Oakmont and Verona, which he did for seven months.

Dermody also worked as a legal advisor to Allegheny County's district justices, an instructor at the Community College of Allegheny County, and a faculty member of the Pennsylvania Bar Institute for Continuing Legal Education.

State Representative
In 1990, Dermody ran for the Pennsylvania House of Representatives in the 33rd Legislative District. His district is located in northeastern Allegheny County, including Brackenridge, Cheswick, East Deer, Fawn, Frazer, Harmar, Harrison, Indiana, Oakmont, part of Plum, Springdale, Tarentum, and West Deer. In the Democratic primary, he faced Arlene S. Loeffler, the president of the Riverview School Board. He won with 2,870 votes, or 53%, against Loeffler's 2,524 votes, or 47%.

In the general election, Dermody faced one-term Republican incumbent Ted V. Kondrich. The criminal justice system, education, and the environment were regarded as the top issues of the campaign. Dermody ultimately defeated Kondrich, receiving 9,082 votes to Kondrich's 8,430. He has been re-elected every two years since.

Dermody was chairman of the Subcommittee on Courts in the Judiciary Committee from 1991 to 2006, and served on the Pennsylvania Commission on Sentencing from 1991 to 2010, including 14 years as commission chairman. In 1994, he was selected by House leaders to lead the investigation into charges against Supreme Court Justice Rolf Larsen, serving as a key House manager (prosecutor) in the impeachment trial that led to Larsen's eventual removal. 

He served as chairman of the Allegheny County's House Democratic delegation (1994–2006) and as caucus secretary (2006–2008). In 2009, he was elected Majority Whip, the second-highest position for his party in the House. In late 2010, he was elected Democratic floor leader on November 17, 2010, after incumbent Todd Eachus was defeated in his bid for re-election.

Dermody was defeated for reelection in 2020 by Carrie DelRosso.

Personal life
Dermody resides in Oakmont with his wife, Debra (née Hewetson) Dermody, who was his classmate in law school. They have two children, Frank and Cara.

References

External links
Pennsylvania House of Representatives - Frank Dermody official PA House website
 
Pennsylvania House Democratic Caucus - Rep. Frank Dermody official Party website

1951 births
2012 United States presidential electors
21st-century American politicians
Columbia Lions football players
Indiana University alumni
Living people
Democratic Party members of the Pennsylvania House of Representatives
People from Allegheny County, Pennsylvania
Politicians from Scranton, Pennsylvania